Scinax sugillatus is a species of frog in the family Hylidae.
It is found in Colombia and Ecuador.
Its natural habitats are subtropical or tropical moist lowland forests, freshwater marshes, intermittent freshwater marshes, plantations, rural gardens, heavily degraded former forest, and ponds.

References

sugillatus
Amphibians of Colombia
Amphibians of Ecuador
Amphibians described in 1973
Taxonomy articles created by Polbot